Sopatas' black-kneed katydid (Aprosphylus sopatarum) is a species of katydid that is endemic to the Klein karoo biome of Western Cape province in South Africa. It is threatened by overgrazing by livestock and changes in weather patterns affecting its microhabitat.

References

Tettigoniidae
Endemic insects of South Africa
Insects described in 1994